"Heathens" is a song by American musical duo Twenty One Pilots, released as the lead single from the motion picture soundtrack to the DC Comics film Suicide Squad (2016) on June 16, 2016, through Atlantic Records. The song was written by Tyler Joseph and produced by him along with Mike Elizondo. "Heathens" peaked at number two on the US Billboard Hot 100, tying with "Stressed Out" for the duo's highest-charting single to date. "Heathens" was nominated for three Grammy Awards at the 59th annual awards ceremony.

Background 
On June 15, 2016, the song was leaked through a Reddit post. Later that same day, Twenty One Pilots tweeted a message in Morse code which read "takeitslow", a lyric taken from the song "Heathens". The following day, June 16, the song was revealed to be featured on the motion picture soundtrack for the 2016 American superhero film based on the DC Comics antihero team Suicide Squad. The soundtrack was released on August 5.

Composition
"Heathens" is an rap rock song that lasts for a duration of three minutes and fifteen seconds. According to the sheet music published at Musicnotes.com by Alfred Music, it is written in the time signature of common time, with a moderate tempo of 90 beats per minute. "Heathens" is composed in the key of E minor, while Tyler Joseph's vocal range spans one octave and three notes, from a low of E3 to a high of G4. The song has a basic sequence of C–Em–Am–Em in the verses, changes to C/E–Am–Em–C–Am–B7 during the pre-chorus, and follows C–Am–E at the refrain, bridge and outro as its chord progression.

Critical reception 
Sam Law of the predominantly rock music-related magazine Kerrang! named it the band's sixth best song in April 2020, describing it as a "deliciously insidious single" and "largely unlike anything else they'd done" he further said that it was "the best thing to come out of 2016's otherwise almost-entirely abortive Suicide Squad adaptation".

Commercial performance 
The song peaked in the runner-up position for four consecutive weeks on the US Billboard Hot 100, but was kept out of the top spot by The Chainsmokers' "Closer", becoming the duo's second top 5 single on the Hot 100. It is the band's highest-peaking single, tied with "Stressed Out". It spent 18 consecutive weeks in the top 10 of the Hot 100 before it dropped out on December 31, 2016.

With "Ride" charting at number five and "Heathens" at four in the same week, Twenty One Pilots had become the third rock act with simultaneous top five Hot 100 singles in the chart's 58-year history, following only the Beatles and Elvis Presley, as well as the first duo in three years. "Heathens" reached number one on the Hot Rock Songs chart, and holds the record for second longest running single at number one, spending 30 weeks at the summit. The song also peaked at number one on the Alternative Songs chart, and reached the top 20 in a variety of other charts. As of September 2017, "Heathens" had sold over 2.1 million copies in the US.

The song had also reached number five on the UK Singles Chart. "Heathens" also made it into the top 10 in more than 15 different countries, including Australia, Belgium, Canada and Switzerland.

Music video 
The official music video, directed by Andrew Donoho, was uploaded to the Fueled by Ramen YouTube channel in June 2016. It shows Joseph singing the song in Belle Reve, a fictional prison in the DC Universe, with Dun appearing while playing drums in the course of the video. Joseph makes his way to a small stage in the middle of a room, where Dun is already on the stage playing the drums. Joseph then picks up a floating bass guitar and begins playing it while the prisoners leave their cells and watch the duo perform the remainder of the song. At the end of the video, Joseph is sitting in the room alone as the prison security guards surround him. Throughout the music video, various clips of Suicide Squad are played. As of March 2023, the video has over 2 billion views on YouTube. It also has over 13 million likes and is the second video by Twenty One Pilots to surpass this amount.

The clip won an award for Best Rock Video at the 2016 MTV Video Music Awards.

Live performances 
The band performed "Heathens" for the first time in concert at The Uptown Amphitheatre at the Music Factory in Charlotte, North Carolina on June 28, 2016, as part of their Emotional Roadshow World Tour. The song was later performed as part of the band's appearance on episode two of Saturday Night Live'''s forty-second season.

 Covers 
Chicago-based rapper Vic Mensa performed a freestyle over the instrumental of the track. Opening with the band's chorus, the "heathens freestyle" features Mensa rapping for two minutes straight. His verse touches on real-life violence, providing insight into what he experienced first-hand growing up on the South Side of Chicago. The song's lyrics contain self-referential jokes regarding his sampling of Twenty One Pilots as well as a reference to the film Zenon: Girl of the 21st Century. Vic Mensa appeared in a cover art inspired by The Joker to accompany the freestyle. "Heathens" was covered by metal band Halestorm, for their cover album, Reanimate 3.0, released on January 6, 2017. The song was covered by the American indie pop band Blondfire. "Heathens" was featured in the Twenty One Pilots Mashup by Kurt Hugo Schneider, featuring VoicePlay.

Usage in media
Seven days after the song's release, it was used to accompany television advertisements for the American TV show Chicago P.D. on RTÉ2, and was used to accompany the first half of a Problem Gambling documentary created by Davy Glennon, aired on Claire Byrne Live on November 22, 2016. "Heathens" was also performed live with a collaboration with the Netflix series Stranger Things'' on July 22, 2022 at a concert in Romania.

Track listing

Personnel 
 Tyler Joseph – vocals, piano, bass guitar, guitar, synthesizers, programming, keyboards
 Josh Dun – drums, percussion

Additional musicians 
 Mike Elizondo – keyboards, programming

Charts

Weekly charts

Year-end charts

Decade-end charts

Certifications

Release history

See also
 List of best-selling singles in the United States
 List of number-one Billboard Rock Songs

References

External links
 

2016 singles
2016 songs
Atlantic Records singles
Fueled by Ramen singles
Suicide Squad (film series)
Songs written for films
Songs written by Tyler Joseph
Twenty One Pilots songs
Warner Records singles
Industrial songs
American rock songs
Rap rock songs
Song recordings produced by Mike Elizondo
Songs about prison
DC Extended Universe music